The Academy of Sciences and Arts of the Republika Srpska (АНУРС, Bosnian and Croatian Akademija nauka i umjetnosti Republike Srpske, ANURS) is highest representative institution in the Republika Srpska of science and art founded in 1996. It has four departments – Department of Social Sciences, Department of Literature and Arts, Department of Natural, Mathematical and Technical Sciences and the Department of Medical Sciences. It is based in Banja Luka.

List of presidents

Members

Some prominent members of the Academy are:

See also
 Academy of Sciences and Arts of Bosnia and Herzegovina
 Bosniak Academy of Sciences and Arts
 Culture of Republika Srpska
 Serbian Academy of Sciences and Arts

References

External links 
 The official web site of the Academy of Sciences and Arts of the Republika Srpska
 International Science Council: Academy of Sciences and Arts of the Republika Srpska

 
Members of the International Science Council